"Linda" is a song recorded by the Latin Grammy-winning Spanish musician and actor Miguel Bosé. It was released in 1978 to promote the album of the same name. In 2012 a version featuring Malú, a Spanish multi-selling singer, was released as the first single from his second duets album Papitwo (2012).  The song was released for digital download on September 3, 2012.

Track listing

Chart performance

References

1978 singles
2012 singles
Miguel Bosé songs
2012 songs
Warner Music Latina singles